The Army Band Hannover is a musical band unit of the German Army based in Hannover, Lower Saxony.

Description

It was established as Musikkorps II A on July 1, 1956. Its founding came at a time when military bands of East Germany and West Germany were being founded, with then-Chancellor Konrad Adenauer of West Germany placing significant importance to the founding of similar army bands during the development period of the German Heer. It later on was given the name "Army Band 1" in 1959, following its joining with the 1st Panzer Division that year. Army Band 1 published in 1967 its first official record which was called the "Great Concert of the Bundeswehr". Since then, the band has produced numerous CDs of its music, with the most one being made in January 2011. Like the Staff Band of the Bundeswehr, the band is responsible for the musical aspect of the ceremonial protocol events that take place in the federal states of Lower Saxony and North Rhine-Westphalia.

Besides serving in its area of responsibility, the Army Band Hannover also takes part in other national and international events with a professional background. These include appearances on local and national radio and television stations such as Bremen Vier and Vodafone Kabel Deutschland. The band also has had a history of taking part in military music festivals and international events such as the 1972 Summer Olympics in Munich.

Ensembles
 Ceremonial Band
 Corps of Drums
 Concert Band
 Dance Band
 Woodwinds Ensemble
 Brass Ensemble
 Wind quartet

List of conductors
1956-1966 Major Martin Kothe
1966-1978 Lieutenant Colonel Hans Herzberg
1978-1987 Lieutenant Colonel Eberhard von Freymann
1987-1991 Lieutenant Colonel Robert Kuckertz
1991-1996 Lieutenant Colonel Martin Kötter
1996-2008 Lieutenant Colonel Friedrich Szepansky
2008-2014 Lieutenant Colonel Manfred Peter
2014-today Lieutenant Colonel Martin Wehn

References

Military units and formations established in 1956
German military bands